James Inglis (24 November 1845 – 15 October 1908) was a colonial tea planter, merchant, writer who worked in India before serving as a politician in colonial New South Wales. He was involved in tea trade between India and Australia. He also wrote poetry, books on travel and sport hunting.

Biography 
Inglis was the son of Rev. Robert Inglis, M.A. of the Free Church and Helen  née Brand, born at Edzell, Forfarshire, Scotland. He was educated at University of Edinburgh. He visited New Zealand in 1864 to join the gold rush at Timaru, went to India at the end of 1866 where his brother Alexander was a Calcutta tea merchant. He settled there as an indigo planter and indulged in sport in his spare time and wrote under the pen name "Maori".  He served as a Famine Commissioner in Bhagalpur in 1875, and Executive Commissioner for the Government of India to the Melbourne International Exhibition of 1880–81. He suffered from rheumatism from 1877 and left to Australia to write for the Pioneer Mail newspaper. He also became a correspondent for the Echo and Sydney Mail. He married Mary née Nichol in 1879 and worked with Cowan and Co. He worked as an agent for trade between India and Australia becoming agent in Sydney for the Indian Tea Association. In 1883 he joined W. P. Brown to set up Inglis, Brown and Company. In 1884 he was involved in introducing Indian plants of economic value into Australia. In 1886 he became a vice president of the Free Trade Association. He became a representative in the New South Wales Legislative Assembly for New England in 1885, and was Minister of Public Instruction in the Parkes ministry (1887–1889) from January 1887 to January 1889.

"Waltzing Matilda"

His company James Inglis & Co marketed the brand Billy Tea, to advertise which Banjo Paterson's song Waltzing Matilda was adapted to words and music which were very popular and came to be known as Australia's "unofficial national anthem".

Publications
Inglis wrote to the press under the signature "Maori," and, in 1879, served as editor of the Newcastle Morning Herald. His books included:
"Tirhoot Rhymes" (1873)
"Sport and Work on the Nepaul Frontier" (Macmillan & Co., London, 1880) 
"Our Australian Cousins" (Macmillan, 1882) 
"Our New Zealand Cousins" (Sampson Low & Co., London, 1886)
"Tent Life in Tiger Land" (Sampson Low, 1888)
"Oor Ain Folk" (1894) 
"The Humor of the Scot" (1894)

Private life
Inglis married Mary Nichol in Sydney in October 1879. She died in 1903. On 13 December 1905 he married Ethel Kate Mason, née Macpherson, who survived him. There were no children from either marriage.

Inglis died in Strathfield, Sydney, of kidney disease on 15 October 1908 and was buried in the Presbyterian section of Rookwood cemetery.

References

External links
 
 
 

1845 births
1908 deaths
Members of the New South Wales Legislative Assembly
People from Angus, Scotland
Scottish emigrants to Australia
Alumni of the University of Edinburgh
19th-century Australian politicians